Belenois raffrayi, or Raffray's white, is a butterfly in the family Pieridae. It is found in Ethiopia, Sudan, Uganda, Kenya, Rwanda, Burundi, the Democratic Republic of the Congo and Tanzania. The habitat consists of montane forests and open grassland.

The larvae feed on Capparis and Rhus species.

Subspecies
B. r. raffrayi (southern Ethiopia, southern Sudan)
B. r. extendens (Joicey & Talbot, 1927) (Uganda, western Kenya, Rwanda, Burundi, Democratic Republic of the Congo, north-western Tanzania)
B. r. similis Kielland, 1978 (Tanzania)

References

External links
Seitz, A. Die Gross-Schmetterlinge der Erde 13: Die Afrikanischen Tagfalter. Plate XIII 13

Butterflies described in 1878
Pierini
Butterflies of Africa
Taxa named by Charles Oberthür